Foshchevaty is a rural locality (a khutor) in Krasnogvardeysky District, Belgorod Oblast, Russia. The population was 52 as of 2010. There is 1 street.

Geography 
Foshchevaty is located 38 km southwest of Biryuch (the district's administrative centre) by road. Livenka is the nearest rural locality.

References 

Rural localities in Krasnogvardeysky District, Belgorod Oblast